Moanin': Portrait of Art Blakey is an album by the New York Rhythm Machine, led by pianist John Hicks.

Background
Pianist John Hicks was part of Art Blakey's band for two years from 1964. Blakey died in 1990.

Recording and music
The album was recorded at Sear Sound, New York City, on October 19, 1992. The musicians were Hicks, bassist Marcus McLaurine, and drummer Victor Lewis.

Releases
Moanin': Portrait of Art Blakey was released by Venus Records. Venus later issued a CD with the same title, crediting it to Hicks as leader; it contained six tracks, that combined some from the original release and some from Blues March: Portrait of Art Blakey.

Track listing
"Moanin'"
"Nica's Dream"
"'Round Midnight"
"Caravan"
"I Remember Clifford"
"No Problem – 2"

Personnel
John Hicks – piano
Marcus McLaurine – bass
Victor Lewis – drums

References

John Hicks (jazz pianist) albums
1992 albums